Junki (written: , , , , , , , or ) is a masculine Japanese given name. Notable people with the name include:

, Japanese footballer
, Japanese footballer
, Japanese footballer
, Japanese baseball player
, Japanese footballer
, Japanese baseball player
, Japanese footballer
, Japanese actor
, Japanese footballer

Junki Kono (河野 純喜, born 1998) Japanese idol, member of JO1

Japanese masculine given names